Assistant Secretary of the Army is a title used to describe various civilian officials in the United States Department of the Army.

Present Assistant Secretaries of the Army

At present, there are five offices bearing the title of Assistant Secretary of the Army:

 Assistant Secretary of the Army (Acquisition, Logistics and Technology)
 Assistant Secretary of the Army (Civil Works)
 Assistant Secretary of the Army (Financial Management and Comptroller)
 Assistant Secretary of the Army (Installations, Energy and Environment)
 Assistant Secretary of the Army (Manpower and Reserve Affairs)

The General Counsel of the Army is equivalent in rank to the Assistant Secretaries.

The five Assistant Secretaries and the GC report to and assist the United States Secretary of the Army and the United States Under Secretary of the Army.

By law, the Assistant Secretaries "shall be appointed from civilian life by the President, by and with the advice and consent of the Senate".

History

The office of Assistant Secretary of the Army was established at the time of the creation of the United States Department of Defense in 1947, and assumed many of the duties previously carried out by the United States Assistant Secretary of War in the United States Department of War.  In February 1950, a second office, Assistant Secretary of the Army (General Management) was added.  In May 1952, Assistant Secretary of the Army Earl D. Johnson's office was renamed Assistant Secretary of the Army (Research and Materiel), making Jones the last individual to bear the stand-alone title of Assistant Secretary of the Army.  In addition to the current offices bearing the title of Assistant Secretary of the Army, several individuals have held office as some type of Assistant Secretary, as shown below.

Assistant Secretaries of the Army, 1947—1952

Assistant Secretaries of the Army (General Management), 1950—1953

Assistant Secretary of the Army (Research and Materiel), 1952

Assistant Secretary of the Army (Materiel), 1953—1954

Assistant Secretaries of the Army (Civil-Military Affairs), 1954—1958

References

External links
10 U.S.C. § 3016, specifying the duties of the Assistant Secretaries of the Army

United States Army civilians
United States Army organization